Thomas Rempston (KG)
 Thomas Rempston (died 1458)